SM UC-108 was a German Type UC III minelaying submarine or U-boat built for the German Imperial Navy during World War I.

Design
A German Type UC III submarine, UC-100 had a displacement of  when at the surface and  while submerged. The submarine was powered by two six-cylinder four-stroke diesel engines each producing  (a total of ), two electric motors producing , and two propeller shafts.

UC-100 was fitted with six  mine tubes, fourteen UC 200 mines, three  torpedo tubes (one on the stern and two on the bow), seven torpedoes, and one  SK L/45 or  Uk L/30 deck gun . Her complement was twenty-six crew members.

Construction and career
The U-boat was launched on 2 June 1918 and completed on 15 November 1918. Because UC-108 was finished after the end of fighting, she was never commissioned into the German Imperial Navy; had she been so commissioned, she would have been named SM UC-108. UC-108 was awarded to the France as a war reparation and broken up in 1921.

References

Notes

Citations

Bibliography

 
 

Ships built in Hamburg
German Type UC III submarines
World War I minelayers of Germany
World War I submarines of Germany
1918 ships